Randall Crane Ph.D. is professor emeritus of the UCLA Luskin School of Public Affairs, where he taught since 1999. He was associate then editor-in-chief of the Journal of the American Planning Association, chair of the executive committee and director of Undergraduate Studies of the Luskin School, associate and acting director of the UCLA Institute of Transportation Studies, and department vice chair and director of PhD studies of the urban planning department, among other cross-campus administrative appointments.

After graduating from Paradise High School in the Northern California Sierra foothills in 1970, Crane received his B.A. from the University of California, Santa Barbara. Following a period as an anti-poverty worker in East Tennessee, he later earned a Ph.D. in urban studies & planning from MIT, where he studied micro, public and urban economics with Peter Diamond, Martin Feldstein, Eric Maskin, Daniel McFadden, Jerome Rothenberg, Paul Samuelson, Robert Solow, Larry Summers, and William Wheaton. His dissertation is titled, Essays in Local Public Finance, 1987.

On November 8, 2022, Crane defeated incumbent Sat Tamaribuchi in the general election for Municipal Water District of Orange County District 5 

In 2016, he was senior scholar at the WRI Ross Center for Sustainable Cities, World Resources Institute, DC.

In 2008, he was visiting scholar at Harvard University Graduate School of Design and a visiting fellow at the Lincoln Institute of Land Policy.

From 1990 to 1999 he was assistant and associate professor of urban planning, economics, and transportation science at the University of California, Irvine.

From 1994 to 1995 he was visiting research fellow at the Center for U.S.-Mexican Studies at UC San Diego.
 
From 1989 to 1990 he was Fulbright Professor at El Colegio de México, Mexico City.

In 1990 he was resident advisor to the Harvard Institute for International Development Public Finance project in Jakarta, Indonesia.

He continues to consult as a development reform advisor, with field experience in China, Colombia, Guyana, Indonesia, Kenya, México, the Philippines, Thailand, Vietnam, and Yemen.

Selected publications

Public Finance for Economic Development, in Financing for Economic Development, S. White and Z. Kotval, eds., M.E. Sharpe, 2013.
The Oxford Handbook of Urban Planning, Oxford University Press, coedited with Rachel Weber, 2012.
Planning for Access, in The Practice of Local Planning, G. Hack and E. Birch, et al., eds., ICMA Green Book, 2008 (with L. Takahashi). 
Is There a Quiet Revolution in Womenʼs Travel?  Revisiting the Gender Gap in Commuting, Journal of the American Planning Association 73, 2007. 
Public Finance Challenges for Chinese Urban Development, in Important Issues in the Era of Rapid Urbanization in China, C. Ding and Y. Song, eds., 2007 
Emerging Planning Challenges in Retail: The Case of Wal-Mart. Journal of the American Planning Association 71, 2005. (with M. Boarnet, D. Chatman and M. Manville)
Does the Built Environment Influence Physical Activity? Examining the Evidence, a National Research Council Report of the Committee on Physical Activity, Health, Transportation, and Land Use. Washington, D.C.: National Academy Press, 2005
Travel by Design: The Influence of Urban Form on Travel, Oxford University Press, 2001.
The Influence of Land Use on Travel Behavior: Estimation and Specification Issues, Transportation Research A 35, 2001. (with M. Boarnet)
The Impacts of Urban Form on Travel: An Interpretive Review, Journal of Planning Literature 15, 2000.
Urban Development and Management Strategies for the Cities of Sana'a and Taiz, Yemen, Ministry of Housing, Construction and Urban Planning, Government of Yemen and the World Bank, 2000.
The Impacts of Urban Form on Travel: An Interpretive Review, Journal of Planning Literature, 2000.
Who Are the Suburban Homeless and What Do They Want? An Empirical Study of the Demand for Public Services, Journal of Planning Education & Research 18, 1998. (with L. Takahashi)
Measuring Access to Basic Services in Global Cities: Descriptive and Behavioral Approaches, Journal of the American Planning Association 62, Spring 1996. (with A. Daniere)
The Influence of Uncertain Job Location on Urban Form and the Journey to Work, Journal of Urban Economics 39, 1996.
Cars and Drivers in the New Suburbs: Linking Access to Travel in Neotraditional Planning, Journal of the American Planning Association 62, Winter 1996.
Water Markets, Market Reform, and the Urban Poor: Results from Jakarta, Indonesia, World Development 22, 1994.
The Economics of Water Supply, Proceedings of the National Research Council/Mexican Academy of Sciences meeting on water problems in Mexico City, National Research Council, National Academies of Science, Washington, D.C., and Querétero, Mexico, 1992.
On Welfare Measurement in Cities, Journal of Urban Economics 31, 1992.
Price Specification and the Demand for Public Goods, Journal of Public Economics 43, 1990.

Selected invited presentations

Equity and Inclusiveness as Building Blocks for Local Government Planning, OECD Conference, Seoul, Korea, December 2017
On Planning Smart: Practice, Research and Education, 10th Year Celebration of the DUPM, Renmin University, Beijing, PRC, September 2017
UN Sustainable Development Goal 11: Sustainable Cities & Communities, Sustainability Goals Series, UCLA Fielding School of Public Health, May 2017
Lectures on Urbanization and Development, University of Sichuan, Chengdu, PRC, July 2015
Private Solutions to Basic Urban Service Gaps in Africa, World Resources Institute, Washington DC, May 2015
Comparing Urban Problems and Policies in the US and the PRC, University of Sichuan, Chengdu, PRC, July 2014
Efficient Public Finance in Diverse Cities: Modelling the Choices Amongst Taxes in an Open Economy, Planning Urban Infrastructure, Martin Centre for Architectural and Urban Studies, Cambridge University, April 2014
New Developments in the Economic Modelling of Urban Design, Productive, Liveable and Sustainable City Regions, Centre for Research in the Arts, Social Sciences and Humanities, Cambridge University, June 2013
Issues in Publishing Planning Research and Practice, Association of Collegiate Schools of Planning, Cincinnati, November 2012.
The New Smart Growth: Practice, Education & Research, Keynote, China Urban Planning Education Network Congress, Wuhan University, Wuhan, PRC, September 2012
Public Private Partnerships in Urban Development: The Case of New Downtowns in China, Keynote, Peking University, Beijing, PRC July 2012
Competitive Cities & Municipalities, Mayors’ Forum, Philippine Local Government Academy, Manila, Philippines, January 2012
Water in Megacities: Solutions, 2011 Global Economic Symposium, Kiel, Germany, October 2011
Commuting in Beijing: New Results, International Association for China Planning Conference, Beijing, June 2011
Race, Gender and Sprawl, and The Right to the Suburb? Graduate School of Design, Harvard University, April 2011
Reforming the Public Finance of Land in China, for the symposium China's Three Decades of Urban Planning through an International Perspective, Urban Planning Society of China, Xiamen, November 2008
Mobility and Congestion, 100th National Planning Conference, American Planning Association, Las Vegas, April 2008
Smart Growth with Chinese Characteristics: Transportation/Land Use Integration in Urban China, Harvard China Project, Harvard University, March 2008
Sex, Race and Traffic: What is Changing and Why, and How Urban Form Affects Travel, Public Health, and Climate Change, Distinguished Speaker Series, MIT Center for Transportation & Logistics, March 2008
Public/Private People/Place Development Strategies, Graduate School of Design, Harvard University, March 2008
Fiscal Decentralization in Guyana and the Caribbean, Georgetown City Hall, Guyana, 2002
City Building from Scratch: The Case of Yemen, Association of Collegiate Schools of Planning, Baltimore, 2001

External links
 Faculty page at UCLA

Notes

American urban planners
Academic staff of El Colegio de México
Living people
MIT School of Architecture and Planning alumni
University of California, Irvine faculty
UCLA Luskin School of Public Affairs faculty
University of California, Santa Barbara alumni
Year of birth missing (living people)